Llangollen railway station in the town of Llangollen, Denbighshire, Wales, is a preserved railway station on the former Ruabon to Barmouth Line, and now the eastern terminus of the preserved Llangollen Railway.

History

Development
Llangollen was already a popular place for Victorian era tourists by the 1840s.

However, the commercial development of the local mining industry meant that the development of a railway became essential to the region's economic development. A number of schemes were proposed, including one by the LNWR, but it was not until 1 August 1859 that a scheme engineered by Henry Robertson received Royal Assent. The line opened to freight on 1 December 1861, and to passengers on 2 June 1862 at a temporary terminus on the town's eastern outskirts.

It, together with the new centrally positioned and larger station in Llangollen, opened for service on 1 May 1865.

Operations
Between then and World War I, Acrefair,  and Llangollen stations were all in part remodelled to cope with additional traffic. There were signal boxes at Llangollen and Llangollen Goods Jnc., with the latter controlling access to the goods yard, which today is a depot for the preserved railway.

According to the Official Handbook of Stations the following classes of traffic were being handled at this station in 1956: G, P, F, L, H, C and there was a 3-ton crane. There was also a private siding at Pentrefelin (now a carriage depot) that was used by the White Sand & Silica Company.

Closure

Designated for closure under the Beeching cuts, the station closed to passengers on Monday 18 January 1965 but the section between Ruabon and Llangollen Goods Yard remained opened for freight traffic until April 1968. Immediately afterwards the track was removed from the whole line between Ruabon and Barmouth Jn.

Preservation
The Flint and Deeside Railway Preservation Society was founded in 1972, with the aim of preserving one of the region's "axed" railways. Originally the society was interested in preserving the Dyserth to Prestatyn line; however that line was deemed unsuitable because a small amount of freight traffic was still using it. The society refocused its attention on the Llangollen to Corwen section of the Ruabon to Barmouth line. The station reopened on 13 September 1975, with just  of track.

The refurbished station now encloses the Robertson Suite, which is available for hire as a venue for licensed weddings, functions or training.

Neighbouring stations

References
 
 
 
 Llangollen station on navigable 1952 O. S. map

Notes

Further reading

External links

Railway stations in Great Britain opened in 1862
Railway stations in Great Britain closed in 1965
Llangollen
Beeching closures in Wales
Heritage railway stations in Denbighshire
Llangollen Railway
1862 establishments in Wales
Grade II listed buildings in Denbighshire
Grade II listed railway stations in Wales